The legislative districts of Batangas are the representations of the province of Batangas in the various national and local legislatures of the Philippines. At present, the province is represented in the House of Representatives of the Philippines by its six congressional districts, with the districts' representatives being elected every three years. Additionally, each district is allotted two seats in the Batangas Provincial Board, creating a total of twelve elective seats in the legislature.

History 
Batangas was initially composed of one representative district, wherein it elected four representatives, at large, to the Malolos Congress in 1898. It was later divided into three representative districts in 1907 for the Philippine Assembly, with a minor adjustment of district boundaries as mandated by Act No. 3378 (enacted on December 3, 1927) taking effect starting in the 1928 elections. When seats for the upper house of the Philippine Legislature were elected from territory-based districts between 1916 and 1935, the province formed part of the fifth senatorial district which elected two out of the 24-member senate. It remained so until 1941.

In the disruption caused by World War II, two delegates represented the province in the National Assembly of the Japanese-sponsored Second Philippine Republic: one was the provincial governor (an ex officio member), while the other was elected through a provincial assembly of KALIBAPI members during the Japanese occupation of the Philippines. Upon the restoration of the Philippine Commonwealth in 1945, the province retained its three pre-war representative districts.

The province was represented in the Interim Batasang Pambansa as part of Region IV-A from 1978 to 1984, and elected four representatives, at large, to the Regular Batasang Pambansa in 1984. Batangas was reapportioned into four congressional districts under the new Constitution which was proclaimed on February 11, 1987, and elected members to the restored House of Representatives starting that same year.

The passage of Republic Act No. 10673 on August 19, 2015, increased the number of the province's representatives from four to six. R.A. No. 10673 separated Batangas City and Lipa from the second and fourth districts, and constituted these cities into the province's fifth and sixth districts, respectively. These two new districts elected their first separate representatives beginning in the 2016 elections.

Current districts 
The province was last redistricted in 2015, wherein the province gained two seats in the House. The province's current congressional delegation composes of four members of the  Nacionalista Party, one member of  Lakas-CMD, and one member of the  Nationalist People's Coalition. All six incumbent representatives are part of the majority bloc.

Historical districts

At-large (defunct)

1898–1899

1943–1944

1984–1986

References 

Batangas
Politics of Batangas